Prostitution in the State of Palestine  is illegal, under Palestinian law. Ramallah has prostitution, but long-term abstinence is common, as premarital sex is seen as taboo in the territories. 

A 2009 report by the UN Development Fund for Women (UNIFEM) and SAWA-All the Women Together Today and Tomorrow, a Palestinian NGO, suggested that an increasing number of women turned to prostitution in the face of poverty and violence.

Background
Under Ottoman rule, there were no laws on prostitution.

After coming under British control during WW1, the attitude of the Authorities towards prostitution reflected those of Britain. Ordinances issued in 1925 (under High Commissioner Herbert Samuel) and 1927 (under Herbert Plumer) introduced laws on prostitution similar to those in Britain. Soliciting, living off the earnings of prostitutes and the keeping of brothels were outlawed.

There is evidence that in WW2, military authorities regulated brothels for soldiers, including medical examinations.

History
According to a report released in 2009, increasing numbers of women in the Gaza Strip and the West Bank had been forced into prostitution by traffickers and family members. The report "Trafficking and Forced Prostitution of Palestinian Women and Girls: Forms of Modern Day Slavery" was supported by the UN Development Fund for Women (UNIFEM) and researched by "SAWA-All the Women Together Today and Tomorrow", a Palestinian NGO, during the first half of 2008.

See also

 Honor killing

References

Resources
"Trafficking and Forced Prostitution of Palestinian Women and Girls: Forms of Modern Day Slavery" UNIFEM 2008

Palestine
Palestine
Society of the State of Palestine
Crime in the State of Palestine